Usapang Real Life is a Philippine talk show and news magazine broadcast by TV5, presented by veteran journalist Luchi Cruz-Valdes. The show premiered on August 15, 2020 on the network's Saturday primetime block at 9:00 pm, following Bangon Talentadong Pinoy and its international debut on Kapatid TV5 on November 7, 2020, albeit on a delayed basis. The talk-oriented program is a blocktime production of ContentCows Company, Inc. for TV5 and Cignal cable channel Colours, on which it airs the following evening as part of its weekend lineup.

Host
Luchi Cruz-Valdes

Episodes
Season 1

See also
 List of programs broadcast by TV5
 Kapatid Channel

References

External links

2020 Philippine television series debuts
2021 Philippine television series endings
Philippine television talk shows
TV5 (Philippine TV network) original programming
Filipino-language television shows
Television series by Cignal Entertainment